Cabo Corrientes is a municipality in the state of Jalisco, Mexico. It is named after the cape of the same name, Cabo Corrientes. The municipal seat is a town named El Tuito.

History

Before the arrival of the Spaniards the region was already populated by Nahua people.

After the Spanish invasion. by March 1525 the peninsular had submitted to the province of Xalisco. 
When the Spanish troops went down to the sea, a large aboriginal army arrived. 
They were armed with bows, clubs, throwing darts, and each one wore a banderilla with multicolored feathers in his hand and on his face.
They were so numerous that Captain Francisco Cortés de San Buenaventura was afraid.
He proposed to avoid fighting, since he calculated that each Spaniard would have to confront a thousand Aborigines, but one of his captains, Angel de Villafana, persuaded him to fight, under four royal banners and others of crimson and apricot On one side the cross and on the other the image of the Purísima.
The struggle was about to begin, but when the banners were uncovered the virgin appeared bright and glittering.
The Indians were amazed by that portent.
Instead of attacking they gathered together, dragged their flags and placed them at the foot of the holy and old priest Juan de Villa Diego, bearer of the banner, and surrendered their arms before Cortes, declared themselves his vassals and celebrated with songs, dances and the sound of boleros and atabales.
In memory of this event the place is called the "Valle de Banderas".

In November 1847 the indigenous people raised a large army when they heard news of the American invasion. 
With the rallying cry of "Long live the Virgin of Guadalajara!" they rebelled against the government. 
In this place, Rojas raised an army of 2000 indigenous people who fought against the conservative chief Francisco Tovar. 
In 1872, Porfirio Díaz took refuge in these lands.

From 1825 to 1890 the region belonged to the 6th canton of Autlan, later to the 10th canton of Mascota. On 1 April 1944, by decree number 4955, it was elevated to category of municipality with the name it takes today. Before that it was called El Tuito (Jalisco) and in 1843 was called San Pedro El Tuito (Jalisco).

Geography

Land
Cabo Corrientes is in the west of the state, on the Pacific Ocean.
The Bahía de Banderas is to the north, Puerto Vallarta to the northeast, Talpa de Allende to the east, Tomatlán to the south, and the Pacific Ocean to the west.

Lower down the land is flatter.
The rocks were formed in the Triassic and Jurassic.
Soils are mostly Eutric Regosol or Feozem Háplico, with Luvisol and Litosol in some areas.

Hydrology

The municipality is in the Central Pacific basin and the Ameca-Tomatlán-Cuale River sub-basin. 
Its hydrological resources are provided by the rivers Las Juntas, El Tuito (Jalisco), Horcones and Tecolotlán. 
Streams are Ipaña, La Boquita, Puchiteca, Tabo Pilero, Maxeque and La Peñita. 
There are thermal springs including Los Carrizalillos. In addition are the estuaries of Maito, La Boquita and Tecolotlán.

Climate
The climate, in the western coastal, is semi dry, with dry winter and spring, and warm without marked changes in temperature.
In the east, it is humid, with dry winter and spring, and warm, with no defined winter season. 
The dominant winds are in the northwest direction.

Government

Municipal presidents

References

Municipalities of Jalisco